Lirularia canaliculata is a species of sea snail, a marine gastropod mollusk in the family Trochidae.

Description
The height of this small shell measures 3 mm. It is broadly umbilicated, pearly and beautifully prismatic. The spire is depressed-conical. It contains five whorls, the first two are smooth, the remainder spirally lirate, and ornamented beneath the channelled sutures with a series of white tubercles, here and there marked with brown. The body whorl is encircled by chestnut-dotted carinae. The base of the shell contains a purple-brown zone. The umbilicus is perspective, margined by a somewhat tubercular cord. The aperture is subcircular.

Distribution
This species occurs in the Atlantic Ocean off Equatorial Guinea and Angola.

References

 Rubio F. & Rolán E. 1997. Una nueva especie de Lirularia (Gastropoda: Trochidae) de las islas de São Tomé y Príncipe. Iberus 15 (1): 23–29.

External links
 

canaliculata
Gastropods described in 1871